The 2015/16 FIS Ski Jumping Continental Cup was the 25th in a row (23rd official) Continental Cup winter season in ski jumping for men and the 12th for ladies. This was also the 14th summer continental cup season for men and 8th for ladies.

Other competitive circuits this season included the World Cup, Grand Prix, FIS Cup, FIS Race and Alpen Cup.

Men

Summer

Winter

Ladies

Summer

Winter

Men's standings

Summer

Winter

Overall (summer + winter)

Ladies' standings

Summer

Winter

Overall (summer + winter)

Europa Cup vs. Continental Cup 
Last two seasons of Europa Cup in 1991/92 and 1992/93 are recognized as first two Continental Cup seasons by International Ski Federation, although Continental Cup under this name officially started first season in 1993/94 season.

References

FIS Ski Jumping Continental Cup
2015 in ski jumping
2016 in ski jumping